{{DISPLAYTITLE:C8H14O6}}
The molecular formula C8H14O6 may refer to:

 Diethyl tartrate, organic compound with the formula (HOCHCO2Et)2
 Dipropyl peroxydicarbonate, organic peroxide

Molecular formulas